Cnemaspis modiglianii  is a species of gecko, a lizard in the family Gekkonidae. The species is endemic to Indonesia.

Etymology
The specific name, modiglianii, is in honor of Italian anthropologist Elio Modigliani.

Geographic range
In Indonesia C. modiglianii is found on Enggano Island and on the islands of the Mentawai Archipelago.

Description

Reproduction
C. modiglianii is oviparous.

References

Further reading
Das I (2005). "Revision of the Genus Cnemaspis Strauch, 1887 (Sauria: Gekkonidae), from the Mentawai and Adjacent Archipelagos off Western Sumatra, Indonesia, with the Description of Four New Species". Journal of Herpetology 39 (2): 233–247. (Cnemaspis modiglianii, new species).

modiglianii
Reptiles described in 2005